The Midland Junction railway station was an important junction station on the Eastern Railway of Western Australia until its closure in 1966.

Its history started on 1 March 1886 when Frederick Broome, then Governor of Western Australia, turned the first sod.

Junction era
Midland Junction was an aptly named locality and railway station, as it had the following services leaving from its platforms:

 the Upper Darling Range Railway or Zig Zag railway to Kalamunda until 1949
 Mundaring (and Mundaring Weir until 1952) until 1954
 Bellevue until 1965
 Chidlow until 1965
 Midland Railway of Western Australia until 1963

It was in effect the point at which all rail services in the Western Australian network had to pass byexcept for the South West line to Bunbury.

It was also a stopping point for Western Australian Government Railways Railway Bus Services until its closure.

The Midland Railway workshops and sheds were to the west on the area now developed with the Centrepoint Shopping Centre just south of the Midland Town Hall and original post office.

Eastern railway 

In the 1890s following the construction of the Eastern Railway  second route, Midland Junction had regular metropolitan passenger services running through on to Chidlow and Mundaring until 1954. Services ceased from the Mundaring Loop or "first route" at that date, but the line was not closed by Parliament until 12 March 1965.

The second route continued until the closure of the Bellevue to Northam line, on 13 February 1966.

Station and yard 

The conditions of the facilities at the station, and the station setup were at different times criticised as being poor and requiring attention.

Signal boxes 
Due to the amount of traffic passing the railway station, the adjacent Midland railway workshops, marshalling yards and other services, there were two signal boxes either end of the railway station.

Following closure

The railway station buildings were removed, as well as surrounding fixtures, except the footbridge over the railway line to the Midland Railway Workshops.

In the 2000s the adjacent footbridge to the Midland Railway Workshops south of the site was removed when the Helena Street railway crossing was re-opened.

The old platform has been utilised by photographers and railfans to watch mainline traffic pass.

Proposed 2020 station

In 2020 a commitment from the government was to replace the 50 year old station to the west, with the development of a new station very close to the location of the original Midland junction station.

See also

Midland line, Perth

Notes

References

 Watson, Lindsay The Railway History Of Midland Junction : Commemorating The Centenary Of Midland Junction, 1895-1995 Swan View, W.A : L & S Drafting in association with the Shire of Swan and the Western Australian Light Railway Preservation Association, [1995]
 Watson, Lindsay.Midland Junction Railway Station  Western rails, Vol 9, no.4(July 1987), p. 10-12
 Verney, Terry 'Thru Midland' The WESTLAND  issue 218, March 2003 p. 4

Disused railway stations in Western Australia
Midland, Western Australia
Eastern Railway (Western Australia)
Rail junctions in Western Australia
Railway stations in Australia opened in 1886
Railway stations closed in 1966
Midland line, Perth